Frederick William Turner (30 July 1870 – 21 February 1952) was an Australian rules footballer who played with St Kilda in the Victorian Football League (VFL).

Family
The son of John Charles Turner (1838-1921), and Martha Turner (1848-1921), née Maxwell, Frederick William Turner was born at Glen Iris, Victoria on 30 July 1870.

He married Edith Bowyer Eyre (1867-1939) in December 1898. They had three children: Vera Beatrice Mary Turner (1900-1984), Leslie William Turner (1905-), and Clive Eyre Turner (1907-1912).

He died at Windsor, Victoria on 21 February 1952.

References

External links 

1870 births
1952 deaths
Australian rules footballers from Melbourne
St Kilda Football Club players
People from Glen Iris, Victoria